David John Mitchell (born 24 August 1945) is an English former footballer who played for Port Vale and Ipswich Town in the Football League in the 1960s.

Career
Mitchell graduated through the Port Vale youth team to sign professional forms under manager Freddie Steele in March 1964. He scored four goals in 19 league and cup games in the 1964–65 season, as the "Valiants" were relegated out of the Third Division. However, he played just five games in the 1965–66 season, scoring one goal in a 3–0 win over Lincoln City at Vale Park, as Vale struggled near the foot of the Fourth Division table under new boss Jackie Mudie. He was given a free transfer in May 1966 and moved on to Ipswich Town. He played just two Second Division games for Bill McGarry's "Blues" in the 1966–67 season, and left the Football League after departing Portman Road.

Career statistics
Source:

References

1945 births
Living people
Footballers from Stoke-on-Trent
English footballers
Association football forwards
Port Vale F.C. players
Ipswich Town F.C. players
English Football League players